The Scouts of Namibia is the national Scouting organization of Namibia. It serves 2,845 Scouts (as of 2011).

Scouting was founded in South West Africa in 1917 and until 1990, Scouting was serviced by the South West Africa Division of the Boy Scouts of South Africa. Namibia became a member of the World Organization of the Scout Movement in 1990.

The coeducational Scouts of Namibia are actively supported by the KFUM-Spejderne i Danmark.

Program

Program sections
The association is divided in three sections:
 Cub Scout - ages 7 to 12
 Scouts - ages 12 to 18
 Rovers - ages 18 to 26
The Rover section was introduced in 2006.

Scout Promise
On my honour I promise that I will do my best:
To do my duty to God, and my Country;
To help other people at all times;
To obey the Scout Law.

Scout Law
 A Scout's honour is to be trusted.
 A Scout is loyal.
 A Scout's duty is to be useful and to help others.
 A Scout is a friend to all and a brother to every other Scout.
 A Scout is courteous.
 A Scout is a friend of nature.
 A Scout is obedient.
 A Scout smiles and whistles under all difficulties.
 A Scout is thrifty.
 A Scout is clean in thought, word and deed.

Emblem

The membership badge of the Scouts of Namibia incorporates the national colours of the flag of Namibia, using the same basic pattern as the historic membership badge used by the South West Africa Division, which was part of the Boy Scouts of South Africa until 1990.

See also
The Girl Guides Association of Namibia 
Deutscher Pfadfinderbund Namibia

References

World Organization of the Scout Movement member organizations
Scouting and Guiding in Namibia